The Dangerous Dude is a 1926 American silent action film directed by Harry Joe Brown and starring Reed Howes, Bruce Gordon and Dorothy Dwan.

Cast
 Reed Howes as Bob Downs 
 Bruce Gordon as Harold Simpson 
 Dorothy Dwan as Janet Jordan 
 Billy Franey
 David Kirby 
 Richard Travers

References

Bibliography
 Munden, Kenneth White. The American Film Institute Catalog of Motion Pictures Produced in the United States, Part 1. University of California Press, 1997.

External links

1926 films
1920s action films
American action films
Films directed by Harry Joe Brown
American silent feature films
Rayart Pictures films
American black-and-white films
1920s English-language films
1920s American films